Jonathan Doin (born 16 August 1988), known as Paulo Miranda, is a Brazilian footballer who plays for Náutico. Mainly a central defender, he can perform equally as a right back.

He is nicknamed after fellow footballer Paulo Miranda when playing for Iraty after a coach said that his name "was not suited for a defender".

Honours
São Paulo
Copa Sudamericana: 2012

Grêmio
Recopa Sudamericana: 2018
Campeonato Gaúcho: 2018, 2019, 2020, 2021
Recopa Gaúcha: 2019, 2021

External links
Profile at São Paulo's website 
Paulo Miranda at playmakerstats.com (English version of ogol.com.br)

1988 births
Living people
Brazilian footballers
Brazilian expatriate footballers
Brazilian people of French descent
Campeonato Brasileiro Série A players
Austrian Football Bundesliga players
Sociedade Esportiva Palmeiras players
Oeste Futebol Clube players
Esporte Clube Bahia players
São Paulo FC players
FC Red Bull Salzburg players
Expatriate footballers in Austria
Brazilian expatriate sportspeople in Austria
Association football defenders
Grêmio Foot-Ball Porto Alegrense players
Esporte Clube Juventude players
Sportspeople from Paraná (state)